The Zhorzholiani or Jorjoliani – is a Georgian family name from the Svaneti region in the north-western Georgia. 

The Zhorzholiani family name comes from these towns of Svaneti: Becho, Lenjeri, Mestia, Mulakhi, Nakipari, Shkedi, Tchvelieri and Tchuberi.

Notable members 
Irakli Zhorzholiani (born 1987), Georgian politician and scientist
Levan Zhorzholiani (born 1988), is a Georgian judoka

References 

Georgian-language surnames